Valeriu Lazăr (born 20 May 1968) is a Moldovan politician who served as deputy prime minister and minister of economy in the First Vlad Filat Cabinet, Second Filat Cabinet and in the Iurie Leancă Cabinet as well. On 2 July 2014 he resigned from the office of minister of economy.

Lazăr is a member of the Democratic Party of Moldova.

References

1968 births
Living people
Deputy Prime Ministers of Moldova
Moldovan MPs 2009
People from Hîncești District
Moldovan Ministers of Economy
Democratic Party of Moldova MPs